Óscar Adolfo Villegas Cámara (born 15 April 1970) is a Bolivian football manager and former player who played as a forward. He is the current manager of Always Ready's youth categories.

Playing career
Born in Cochabamba, Villegas began his career with Enrique Happ, and made his senior debut with Aurora at the age of 17. In the following year, he moved to Bolívar.

Villegas subsequently represented San José, Jorge Wilstermann and Real Santa Cruz before signing for Independiente Petrolero for the 1999 season. However, he suffered a knee injury and subsequently retired.

Coaching career
Shortly after retiring, Villegas joined Rosario Martínez's staff at Real Potosí. He then returned to Aurora as a youth coach, and later worked at Independiente de Quillacollo.

After a period at Wilstermann, Villegas returned to Aurora in 2004; initially a manager of the youth sides, he was named manager in March 2004 after Julio Zamora was sacked, but was dismissed in September and subsequently replaced by Juan Carlos Fernández.

Villegas returned to Aurora in 2005, again replacing Zamora, but was replaced by Luis Islas in April 2006. He then returned after Islas left, but was himself replaced in August by Luis Galarza.

In 2007, Villegas was hired by the Bolivian Football Federation, and was manager of their under-17 and under-20 sides. In 2010, he returned to Bolívar, working as manager of the youth categories, and spent the 2014 season in charge of Always Ready after they established a partnership with Bolívar to act as their "B" team.

On 25 April 2016, Villegas was named interim manager of Bolívar, replacing Rubén Darío Insúa. He returned to his previous role in May after the appointment of Beñat San José, and left the club in December 2018, as his youth role was occupied by Wálter Flores.

Villegas subsequently worked as an assistant of his brother at the Bolivia national team, Always Ready and Blooming. On 22 April 2022, he returned to Always, being named manager of the youth categories.

In September 2022, Villegas was named manager of Always Ready until the end of the season, after Julio César Baldivieso was sacked.

Personal life
Villegas' older brother Eduardo was also a footballer, and is also a manager. Both played together at San José in 1994 and later worked together for three years.

References

External links

1970 births
Living people
Bolivian footballers
Association football forwards
Bolivian Primera División players
Club Bolívar players
Club San José players
Club Aurora players
C.D. Jorge Wilstermann players
Real Santa Cruz players
Bolivian football managers
Bolivian Primera División managers
Club Aurora managers
Club Always Ready managers
Club Bolívar managers